Libohovë Castle (Albanian: Kalaja e Libohovës) is a castle in Libohovë, southern Albania.It is possible that Libohovë Castle was built on the ruins of another castle or other structure.  It was built between 1741 and 1822 by Ali Pasha of Ioannina.The castle was built for his sister Shanish as a Wedding Gift. She lived in the castle until she eventually died and her grave is near the city of Libohova.  Today the Castles inner area/Feudal residence is empty but the walls are still standing tall. 

Libohovë
Castles in Albania
Houses completed in 1798
Buildings and structures in Libohovë
Ali Pasha of Ioannina

References

Sources